The Ghana mole-rat or Togo mole-rat (Fukomys zechi) is a species of rodent in the family Bathyergidae.
It is endemic to Ghana.

Its natural habitats are moist savanna, subtropical or tropical dry shrubland, subtropical or tropical dry lowland grassland, caves, and arable land. It commonly breeds during rainy months such as March to August. In a colony, reproduction is limited to one male and one female.

 An important source of food to the Ghana mole-rats are the succulent roots of most plants. The mole rats eat the roots and taproots of various plants such as Arachis, Vigna, Cucumeropsis and Dioscorea abyssinica, as well as young Anacardium.

References

Woods, C. A. and C. W. Kilpatrick. 2005.  pp 1538–1600 in Mammal Species of the World a Taxonomic and Geographic Reference 3rd ed. D. E. Wilson and D. M. Reeder eds. Smithsonian Institution Press, Washington D.C.
Yeboah, S., and K. B. Dakwa. “Aspects of the Feeding Habits and Reproductive Biology of the Ghana Mole-Rat Cryptomys Zechi (Rodentia, Bathyergidae).” African Journal of Ecology, vol. 40, no. 2, 2002, pp. 110–119., 
Yeboah, S., and K. B. Dakwa. "Aspects of the Feeding Habits and Reproductive Biology of the Ghana Mole-Rat Cryptomys Zechi (Rodentia, Bathyergidae)." African Journal of Ecology, vol. 40, no. 2, 2002, pp. 110–119.

Mammals of West Africa
Fukomys
Endemic fauna of Ghana
Mammals described in 1900
Taxonomy articles created by Polbot